This list of Vogue Ukraine cover models is a catalog of cover models who have appeared on the cover of Vogue Ukraine, the Ukrainian edition of Vogue magazine, starting with the magazine's first issue in March 2013.

2013

2014

2015

2016

2017

2018

2019

2020

External links
Vogue UA
Vogue Ukraine at Models.com

Ukraine
Vogue
Ukrainian fashion